Madurai Ramaswamy Sundar (born 5 November 1959) is a noted Carnatic musician.

External links
Official website

References

Male Carnatic singers
Carnatic singers
Living people
1959 births
Singers from Tamil Nadu
Indian Institutes of Technology alumni
Indian Institutes of Management alumni